"Cream" is a song by American singer-songwriter Prince and his backing band the New Power Generation, released in September 1991 as the second single from Prince's 13th studio album, Diamonds and Pearls (1991). In a 2004 MTV special, Prince joked that he wrote the song while looking at himself in the mirror. "Cream" became Prince's fifth and last number-one single on the US Billboard Hot 100, staying at the top for two weeks. The song entered the top 10 in 15 other countries worldwide, peaking within the top three in Australia, Canada, Norway, and Switzerland.

The single's B-side, "Horny Pony", a rap song that was replaced on Diamonds and Pearls at the last minute by "Gett Off", was re-used from the "Gett Off" single. "Cream" was also released as a maxi-single EP with remixes and songs/raps loosely based on "Cream". The EP is notable for including several prank telephone conversations. In the UK, "Gangster Glam" is an additional B-side on the 12-inch maxi maxi-CD single. In Japan, an EP was released with the tracks from the US maxi single, and four tracks from the US "Gett Off" maxi single.

Critical reception
In an retrospective review, Patrick Corcoran from Albumism stated that the oft-repeated tale of "Cream"'s composition "doesn't lessen the impact of its swaggering braggadocio years later". Stephen Thomas Erlewine from AllMusic called it a "sexy T. Rex groove" and a "terrific" pop single. Mike Diver for the BBC said in his 2010 review, that it is "quite simply a song about getting it on, and a brilliant one at that". Upon the single release, Larry Flick from Billboard remarked that after the risque "Gett Off" "comes an equally sexy pop/rocker" that recalls "Bang a Gong". He added, "Militaristic drum beats, an unshakable chorus, and snakey guitar and keyboard lines add up to a pretty good bet for multiformat acceptance." David Browne from Entertainment Weekly described it as "a standard-issue funk workout with oh-so-daring lyrics like "U got the horn so why don't U blow it!"". 

Alexis Petridis from The Guardian viewed the song as a "glorious, loving homage to "Get It On", complete with lyrical echoes (the object of Prince's affections is "filthy-cute" as opposed to "dirty-sweet")." He added, "Never given to underestimating his own importance, Marc Bolan would doubtless have adored it." Pan-European magazine Music & Media commented, "Could this second single from the new album Diamonds and Pearls be a leftover composition of the never-realised Prince/Bonnie Raitt collaboration?" They also concluded, "This basic R&B song is definitely his best single since 1989's "Alphabet Street"." A reviewer from People Magazine deemed it as "tart and bluesy". David Fricke from Rolling Stone described it as "Kiss" "with a garagey Funkadelic kick". Another editor felt the song is "impossibly slinky". Scott Poulson-Bryant from Spin viewed it as "poppy glam-rock". Neil McKay from Sunday Life complimented it as "irresistible pop".

Chart performance
In the United States, "Cream" hit number one for two weeks on the Billboard Hot 100 in November 1991; however, it did not make the Billboard Hot R&B Singles chart because it was not sent to urban radio; "Insatiable" was sent to urban stations instead. The song made the top 20 in the United Kingdom, and it reached the top 10 in several European countries, Australia, and New Zealand. On the Eurochart Hot 100, "Cream" climbed to number six.

Music video
A music video was made to accompany the song, directed by Rebecca Blake.

Influence and legacy
In 2020, Cleveland.com listed "Cream" at number 33 in their ranking of the best Billboard Hot 100 number-one song of the 1990s, stating that it "fully realizes the sultry funk odyssey Prince was going for on his 13th studio album."

Track listing

Several tracks on this release include unlisted telephone segues, and are listed with separate lengths on this page.

Charts

Weekly charts

Year-end charts

Certifications

References

1991 singles
1991 songs
Billboard Hot 100 number-one singles
Cashbox number-one singles
Paisley Park Records singles
Prince (musician) songs
Song recordings produced by Prince (musician)
Songs written by Prince (musician)
Warner Records singles
Glam rock songs